The Men's 10 metre air pistol event took place on 26 July 2014 at the Barry Buddon Shooting Centre. Daniel Repacholi won the gold medal, Prakash Nanjappa won silver medal and Mick Gault won the bronze.

Results

Preliminares

Final
The full final results were:

References

External links
Schedule

Shooting at the 2014 Commonwealth Games